Kathryn "Katie" McLaughlin (born June 9, 1997) is an American competition swimmer who specializes in butterfly and freestyle events. McLaughlin has represented the United States in international competition at the FINA world championships and the Pan Pacific Swimming Championships. She qualified for the 2020 US Olympic Swimming team in the 200m freestyle.

Career
At the 2014 Pan Pacific Swimming Championships, McLaughlin won a bronze medal in the 200m butterfly. She then represented the United States at the 2015 World Aquatics Championships where she won a gold medal in the 4×200 m freestyle relay and a silver medal in the 4×100 m mixed medley relay. She also placed 6th and set a new 17-18 National Age Group Record in the 200m butterfly.
In 2021, at the US Olympic Swimming Trials, she placed fourth in the 200m freestyle, earning a spot on the Olympic team.

Tokyo 2020 Olympics
At the Tokyo 2020 Olympics, McLaughlin won a silver medal swimming the third leg of the Women's 4x200 meter Free Relay, with a split time of 1:55.3.

References

External links
 

1997 births
Living people
American female freestyle swimmers
American female butterfly swimmers
World Aquatics Championships medalists in swimming
Universiade medalists in swimming
Universiade silver medalists for the United States
Universiade bronze medalists for the United States
People from Dana Point, California
Medalists at the 2017 Summer Universiade
Swimmers at the 2020 Summer Olympics
Medalists at the 2020 Summer Olympics
Olympic silver medalists for the United States in swimming
California Golden Bears women's swimmers